Blabicentrus littoralis is a species of beetle in the family Cerambycidae. It was described by Dalens, Touroult and Tavakilian in 2009. It is known from Guyana.

References

Desmiphorini
Beetles described in 2009